OOP, Oop, or oop  may refer to:

Science and technology

 Object-oriented positioning, another name for feature-oriented positioning in microscopy
 Object-oriented programming, a computer programming paradigm
 Order of operations, in mathematics, rules for which parts of an expression are evaluated first
 Out of position (crash testing)

Others

 Order of play, schedule of contests in a tennis event
 Out-of-pocket expenses, in health care, are expenses that the insured party must pay directly to the health care provider
 Out of position, in poker a disadvantageous poker position in the order of play
 Out of print, a term referring to a book or other work that is no longer being published
 Oop!, a software idea in Douglas Coupland's novel Microserfs
 Restraining order, also known as an order of protection or OOP

See also
 Alley Oop (disambiguation)
 Objectives Oriented Project Planning, in project management
 OOPP, out-of-process plug-ins in computer software applications
 Oops (disambiguation)